Speedway is a 1929 silent film about a car racer who clashes with his father, also a driver, at the Indianapolis Speedway. The film was released with a sychronised music score and sound effects track for theaters equipped with sound, this was Haines last silent film.

Plot
Prior to the Indy 500 auto race, Bill Whipple quarrels with his foster father, Jim MacDonald, who is to be one of his rivals that day.

MacDonald suddenly loses his chance to drive because of a heart condition. Whipple's car owner decides to go with another driver, so MacDonald offers his car to Whipple for the race. With victory in sight, Whipple pulls into the pits and lets MacDonald take the checkered flag of victory.

Production
Much of the film was filmed at the Indianapolis Motor Speedway, including extensive footage of the 1929 'Decoration Day' race.

At the end of the film, it is possible to see a car accident on the track, where the vehicle overturns several times and the driver hits his head on the ground. The driver aboard the car Bill Spence died due to head trauma. He participates in the grand prix that was taking place in Indianapolis.

Cast
William Haines as Bill Whipple
Anita Page as Patricia Bonner
Ernest Torrence as Jim MacDonald
Karl Dane as Dugan
John Miljan as Lee Renny
Eugenie Besserer as Mrs. MacDonald
Polly Moran as Waitress

External links

1929 films
1929 romantic drama films
1920s American films
American auto racing films
American black-and-white films
American romantic drama films
American silent feature films
Films shot in Indiana
Indianapolis 500
Metro-Goldwyn-Mayer films
Silent romantic drama films
Silent American drama films